The Johnnie Walker Cambodian Open was an Asian Tour golf tournament. It was played for the first time in 2007 from November 29 to December 2 at the Phokeethra Country Club in Cambodia. The purse was US$300,000. The tournament's main sponsor was Johnnie Walker. The Cambodian Open was the first professional golf tournament hosted in Cambodia.

Winners

External links
Coverage on the Asian Tour's official site

Former Asian Tour events
Sport in Cambodia